Of the 19 Michigan incumbents, 18 were re-elected.

See also 
 List of United States representatives from Michigan
 United States House of Representatives elections, 1972

1972
Michigan
1972 Michigan elections